Clearwater Lake is a lake in the south-west region of the Canadian province of Saskatchewan. It is a spring-fed lake in the Coteau Hills. Much of the lake is surrounded by a regional park, golf course, and cottages. Clearwater Drive-in is located just to the west of the lake.

Clearwater Lake Regional Park 
Clearwater Lake Regional Park is a park on the shore of Clearwater Lake. Elmer and Ann Nelson started the park as a family enterprise in 1925.

The park has a campground with 60 campsites plus a group camping area. Other accommodations include six cabins, four of which include full services. Amenities include a recreation hall for event bookings, convenience store, bar, cafe, beach, playgrounds, golf, and a tennis court.

The golf course is a 9-hole, sand greens course. It is a par 33 totalling 2,296 yards.

See also 
List of lakes of Saskatchewan
List of protected areas of Saskatchewan
List of golf courses in Saskatchewan

References 

Lakes of Saskatchewan
Lacadena No. 228, Saskatchewan